The term Destination Fear may refer to:

Destination Fear, a former Canadian paranormal TV show
Destination Fear, an American paranormal TV show